Sébastien-François Bigot, vicomte de Morogues, (1 March 1706 in Brest, France – 26 August 1781 in Villefallier, near Orléans, Loiret), was a French soldier, a sailor and military naval tactician.

Early life
Sébastien-François Bigot was born on 1 March 1706 in Brest, France.

Career
An artillery specialist, he served in the Royal-Artillerie then the French Navy. In 1759, he commanded the 70 gun Le Magnifique, including at the Battle of Quiberon Bay. He was the first director of the Académie de Marine. In 1763, he published Tactique navale, which was of such quality that it quickly became known in English and Dutch translations. He was made a lieutenant-general in the Navy in 1771.

Death
He died on 26 August 1781 in Villefallier, near Orléans, France.

Legacy
At least three roads in Brittany bear his name, according to the 1997 book Les Noms qui ont fait l'histoire de Bretagne.

Bibliography
Tactique Navale, 1763.

References

Bibliography
 Étienne Taillemite, Dictionnaire des marins français, Paris, 2002, Tallandier, .

1706 births
1781 deaths
French Navy officers from Brest, France
French Navy admirals
French Army officers
French military writers
French male non-fiction writers